Erasmus Daniel Campbell (January 11, 1811 – April 16, 1873) was an American Democratic politician who served as the 6th Lieutenant Governor of Wisconsin, and 2nd Mayor of La Crosse, Wisconsin.  In historical sources, he was sometimes referred to as "E. D. Campbell." In at least one source, he was incorrectly referred to as "Edward Campbell."

Biography

Erasmus D. Campbell was born in South Kingstown, Rhode Island, and lived for a time in Connecticut.  He arrived in La Crosse, Wisconsin, in 1854.  He initially worked as a cashier in a bank owned by J. M. Levy. He studied law and eventually entered a law partnership, Campbell & Wood.

In 1857, Campbell was elected Mayor of La Crosse. As mayor, Campbell advocated for the building a work-house, the purchase and establishment of a poor farm, the construction of a city hall, a new jail, additional school houses, and other infrastructure improvements.  Shortly after he took office, the City Council passed a bond measure to pay for an expanded city jail.  The city selected and purchased a lot of farmland for a poor farm near Shelby.  His year as mayor was ultimately marred by the Panic of 1857, in which Campbell lost a significant portion of his personal wealth and property.  

Later that year, at the 1857 Wisconsin Democratic Party Convention, Mayor Campbell was nominated as the Democratic Party's candidate for Lieutenant Governor in the 1857 election.  Among convention delegates, Campbell received 83 votes to 51 for Henry M. Billings.  Campbell ran alongside Democratic gubernatorial candidate, Milwaukee Mayor James B. Cross.

Campbell defeated his opponent in the general election, Milwaukee abolitionist lawyer Carl Schurz, but his running-mate, Mayor Cross, was defeated by Republican Alexander Randall.

In his later years, Campbell retired to a farm near Shelby.  He died in La Crosse, April 16, 1873.

Legacy

The town of Campbell in La Crosse County, was named after him.

Notes

References
 La Crosse Republican and Leader, La Crosse, Wisconsin, April 19, 1873, obituary of Erasmus D. Campbell. Courtesy of the public archives of the La Crosse Public Library, La Crosse, Wisconsin.

1811 births
1873 deaths
Mayors of La Crosse, Wisconsin
Lieutenant Governors of Wisconsin
People from South Kingstown, Rhode Island
Wisconsin Democrats
19th-century American politicians